Saidu Kargbo (born 15 August 1982) is a boxer from Sierra Leone who competed at the 2008 Olympics. He was defeated by a technical knockout in his first Olympic fight by Łukasz Maszczyk of Poland.

External links
Bio

1982 births
Living people
Boxers at the 2008 Summer Olympics
Light-flyweight boxers
Sierra Leonean male boxers
Olympic boxers of Sierra Leone
Place of birth missing (living people)
21st-century Sierra Leonean people